Gehl is an urban research and design consulting firm based in Copenhagen, Denmark. It was founded in 2000 by Professor Jan Gehl and urban designer Helle Søholt as a continuation of Gehl's research within the area over the past four decades. The firm specialises in improving the quality of urban life by re-orienting city design towards the pedestrian and cyclist.

Gehl has participated in project in over 50 countries and 250 cities around the world. Clients include Municipality of Copenhagen, Department of Transportation (DOT) in New York City, Melbourne City Council, The Energy Foundation in Beijing, China, Brighton & Hove City Council in the UK, City of Christchurch in New Zealand, Institute of Genplan in Moscow, Institute for Transportation and Development Policy, a nonprofit organization headquartered in New York City, among many others.

Publications
 New City Spaces by Jan Gehl & Lars Gemzøe (2000)
 New City life by Jan Gehl, Lars Gemzøe, Sia Kirknæs & Britt S. Søndergaard (2006)
 Cities for People by Jan Gehl (2010)
 How to Study Public Life by Jan Gehl & Birgitte Svarre (2013)
 Soft City by David Sim (2019)

Awards
 2013 (in partnership Christchurch City Council) Architecture of Necessity Triennale from Viserums Konsthall, Sweden.
 2013 Nykredit Architecture Prize, Denmark
 2009 NYC Award, New York City, USA
 2009 Civic Trust Award for Brighton New Road Civic Trust, UK
 2008 Landscape Institute Award, Landscape Institute, UK
 2007 Honorary Academician, The Academy of Urbanism, UK
 Honorary Member of American Institute of Architects
 Design Futures Council Senior Fellow

References

External links
 Gehl Architects Official website and Blog
 Gehl - Making Cities for People on Vimeo
 The Human Scale

Companies based in Copenhagen Municipality
Architecture firms of Denmark
Architecture firms based in Copenhagen
Danish companies established in 2000
Design companies established in 2000
Urban designers